Christopher Charles Walkden (18 April 1938 – 28 July 2011) was a British swimmer. He competed at the 1956 Summer Olympics and the 1960 Summer Olympics.

He represented England and won double bronze in the 220 yards breaststroke and the medley relay at the 1958 British Empire and Commonwealth Games in Cardiff, Wales. At the ASA National British Championships he won the 220 yards breaststroke title in 1955, 1956 and 1958.

References

1938 births
2011 deaths
British male swimmers
Olympic swimmers of Great Britain
Swimmers at the 1956 Summer Olympics
Swimmers at the 1960 Summer Olympics
Sportspeople from Edinburgh
Commonwealth Games medallists in swimming
Commonwealth Games bronze medallists for England
Swimmers at the 1958 British Empire and Commonwealth Games
British male breaststroke swimmers
Medallists at the 1958 British Empire and Commonwealth Games